The following lists events that happened during 1928 in New Zealand.

Population
 Estimated population as of 31 December: 1,467,400
 Increase since previous 31 December 1927: 17,000 (1.17%)
 Males per 100 females: 104.2

Incumbents

Regal and viceregal
Head of state – George V
Governor-General – Charles Fergusson

Government
The 22nd New Zealand Parliament concluded.

Speaker of the House – Charles Statham (Independent)
Prime Minister – Gordon Coates (Reform) until 10 December, then Joseph Ward (United)
Minister of Finance – William Downie Stewart (Reform) until 10 December, then Joseph Ward (United)
Minister of Foreign Affairs – Gordon Coates (Reform) until 10 December, then Joseph Ward (United)

Parliamentary opposition
 Leader of the Opposition – Harry Holland (Labour) until 18 October, then Joseph Ward (United) from 4 to 10 December, then Gordon Coates (Reform).

Judiciary
 Chief Justice – Sir Charles Skerrett

Main centre leaders
Mayor of Auckland – George Baildon
Mayor of Wellington – George Troup
Mayor of Christchurch – John Archer
Mayor of Dunedin – William Taverner

Events 
 New Zealand signs its first bilateral trade agreement, with Japan.
 10 January: George Hood and John Moncrieff attempt the first flight from Australia to New Zealand in an aircraft named Aotearoa, but radio signals cease after 12 hours and they are never seen again.
14 July: The schooner Isabella de Fraine capsizes on the bar at the entrance to Hokianga harbour, with the loss of all eight crew.
24 October: The Weekly Press stops publishing. The magazine started in 1865.

Arts and literature

See 1928 in art, 1928 in literature, :Category:1928 books

Music

See: 1928 in music

Radio

See: Public broadcasting in New Zealand

Film
Taranga / Under the Southern Cross / The Devil's Pit

See: :Category:1928 film awards, 1928 in film, List of New Zealand feature films, Cinema of New Zealand, :Category:1928 films

Sport

Badminton
 National champions
Men's singles: T. Kelly
Women's singles: E. Hetley
Men's doubles: R. Creed-Meredith and L. Wilson
Women's doubles: E. Hetley and F. Harvey
Mixed doubles: Mr and Mrs E. Dart

Chess
The 37th National Chess Championship was held in Christchurch, and was won by A.W.O. Davies of Auckland, his fourth title.

Golf
 The 18th New Zealand Open championship was won by Sloan Morpeth, an amateur.
 The 32nd National Amateur Championships were held in Otago 
 Men: T.H. Horton (Masterton) - 2nd title
 Women: Mrs ? Chrystal

Horse racing

Harness racing
 New Zealand Trotting Cup – Peter Bingen
 Auckland Trotting Cup – Gold Jacket

Thoroughbred racing
 New Zealand Cup – Oratrix
 Avondale Gold Cup – Bisox
 Auckland Cup – Corinax
 Wellington Cup – Star Stranger
 New Zealand Derby – Nightmarch

Lawn bowls
The national outdoor lawn bowls championships are held in Christchurch.
 Men's singles champion – J. Scott (Caledonian Bowling Club)
 Men's pair champions – D. Dumphy, G. Logan (skip) (Maitai Bowling Club)
 Men's fours champions – F. Kettle, V. Langley, D. Hutchison, W. Foster (skip) (Caledonian Bowling Club)

Olympic Games

 Ted Morgan wins a gold medal in boxing at the 1928 Summer Olympics in Amsterdam, becoming the first New Zealander to win an individual Olympic gold medal while competing for New Zealand.

Rugby
:Category:Rugby union in New Zealand, :Category:New Zealand international rugby union players
 Ranfurly Shield. The season started with Canterbury holding the shield, and they defended it against South Canterbury (29-9) before losing it to Wairarapa (7-8). Wairarapa held the shield for the remainder of the season, beating Bush (57-11), Marlborough (26-8), Wellington (9-3) and Manawhenua (31-10).

Rugby league
 Tour of New Zealand by Great Britain, who win the test series 2-1
 1st Test, Dunedin, GB 6-5
 2nd Test, Christchurch, GB 13 - 5
 3rd test, Auckland, NZ 17 - 13

Soccer
 1928 Chatham Cup won by Petone
 Provincial league champions: 
	Auckland:	Tramways
	Canterbury:	Western
	Hawke's Bay:	Napier Rangers
	Nelson:	Athletic
	Otago:	Maori Hill
	South Canterbury:	Colmoco
	Southland:	Corinthians
	Taranaki:	Caledonian
	Waikato:	Pukemiro Junction
	Wanganui:	KP's
	Wellington:	YMCA

Births

January
 4 January – Tom Ah Chee, businessman
 19 January – Dorothy Jelicich, trade unionist, politician
 21 January – Ron Scott, sports administrator

February
 1 February – John Dawson, botanist
 3 February – Bill Crump, cricketer
 5 February – Iain Campbell, cricketer, schoolteacher
 15 February – David Hall, chemist
 16 February – Murray Muir, cricketer
 17 February – Larry Savage, rugby union player
 19 February – Marti Friedlander, photographer
 26 February – Douglas St. John, cricketer
 27 February – Yvonne Cartier, ballet dancer and instructor, mime
 29 February
 Ed Latter, politician
 Alan Loveday, violinist

March
 2 March – Don Richardson, musical arranger, producer and promoter, bandleader
 16 March
 Johnny Dodd, rugby league player
 Leslie Swindale, soil scientist
 17 March – Patricia Bartlett, pro-censorship activist
 21 March – Boyce Richardson, journalist, author, filmmaker
 22 March – Peter Malone, veterinary surgeon, politician
 23 March – Allan Hubbard, businessman
 31 March
 Herbert Familton, alpine skier
 Maurice Goodall, Anglican bishop

April
 3 April – Ralph Matthews, Anglican bishop
 5 April – David Farquhar, composer, music academic
 6 April
 Ivan Armstrong, field hockey player and coach, tennis umpire, schoolteacher
 Dave Dephoff, athlete
 11 April – James Gill, cricketer
 21 April – Ian Brooks, politician
 26 April – Shayle R. Searle, statistician
 27 April – John Brown, cricket umpire

May
 1 May – Tim Francis, diplomat
 4 May – Tim Hewat, television producer and journalist
 6 May – Heather Robson, badminton and tennis player
 16 May – Emily Mair, opera singer, pianist and vocal coach
 24 May – Jane Galletly, television scriptwriter
 25 May – Christopher Rollinson, boxer

June
 3 June – John Reid, cricketer
 4 June – Whakahuihui Vercoe, Anglican archbishop
 27 June – Annette Johnson, alpine skier

July
 4 July – Peter Mander, sailor, businessman
 6 July – Pakaariki Harrison, tohunga whakairo
 10 July – Janet Shackleton, hurdler
 12 July
 Pixie Williams, singer
 Peter Yaxley, rugby league player and referee
 24 July – Shirley Hardman, athlete
 28 July – Edward Raymond Horton, convicted murderer

August
 10 August – Dorrie Parker, athlete
 14 August – John Stoke, occupational medicine expert, public servant
 30 August – Mayzod Reid, diver

September
 4 September – Kerry Ashby, rower
 9 September – Edward Somers, jurist
 18 September
 Basil Arthur, politician
 Arthur Berry, cricketer
 19 September – Kevin Stuart, rugby union player
 21 September – Con Devitt, trade unionist
 25 September – George Hoskins, athlete
 30 September – Owen Dolan, Roman Catholic bishop

October
 6 October – Rex Hamilton, sport shooter
 9 October
 Eris Paton, cricketer
 Derek Steward, athlete
 12 October – Jack Manning, architect
 23 October – Bruce Kent, cyclist
 24 October – Ken Hough, cricketer, association footballer
 26 October – Ian Middleton, novelist
 28 November – Percy Erceg, rugby union player, coach and administrator

November
 4 November – Ross Allen, politician, cricket umpire
 8 November – Rex Forrester, hunter, fisherman
 11 November – Trevor Meale, cricketer
 13 November – John Blumsky, journalist, broadcaster
 23 November – Terry Dunleavy, wine industry leader, politician, columnist
 26 November – David Garner, physical oceanographer
 30 November – Bryan Bartley, civil engineer, inventor

December
 8 December – Maurice Cockerill, rugby union player, cricketer
 9 December – Jim Kelly, cricketer
 10 December – John Barry, tennis player
 11 December
 Norma Williams, swimmer, swimming administrator, journalist
 Arnold Manaaki Wilson, artist, art educator
 15 December – Friedensreich Hundertwasser, artist, architect
 23 December – Jack Skeen, rugby union player
 30 December – Jean Stonell, cricketer

Exact date unknown
 George Groombridge, politician
 Taini Jamison, netball coach and administrator
 Ray Watters, geographer

Deaths

January–March
 23 January – Sir Westby Perceval, politician (born 1854)
 12 February – Benjamin Harris, politician (born 1836)
 16 February – Henry Travers, naturalist (born 1844)
 18 February – William Calder, civil engineer (born 1860)
 19 February – Charles Speight, brewer, businessman (born 1865)
 3 March – Mark Cohen, journalist, educationalist, social reformer (born 1849)
 5 March – Mary Alcorn, interior designer, businesswoman (born 1866)
 21 March – William Robinson, cricketer (born 1863)

April–June
 4 April – Norman Williams, cricketer (born 1864)
 13 April – William Hardham, soldier, Victoria Cross recipient, rugby union player (born 1876)
 20 April – John Callan, lawyer, politician (born 1844)
 1 May – Ned Hughes, rugby union and rugby league player (born 1881)
 6 May – Allan Thomson, geologist, scientific administrator, museum director (born 1881)
 14 May – Falconer Larkworthy, banker, financier (born 1833)
 7 June – John Edie, politician, surveyor, engineer (born 1856)
 30 June – Mohi Te Atahikoia, Ngāti Kahungunu leader, politician, historian (born 1842)

July–September
 28 July – John Leith, cricketer (born 1857)
 30 July – Norris Conradi, cricketer (born 1890)
 2 August – Alexander Watt Williamson, schoolteacher, first graduate of the University of Otago (born 1849)
 8 August – Frederick Earp, farmer, surveyor (born 1841)
 15 August – Annie Rudman, social worker, Salvation Army officer (born 1844)
 18 August – Alfred Mitchell, police superintendent (born 1853)
 21 August – Rachel Reynolds, social worker, community leader (born 1838)
 29 August – Sir William Sim, lawyer, jurist (born 1858)
 2 September – Joseph Hatch, politician (born 1837)

October–December
 1 October – Hugo Friedlander, businessman, politician (born 1850)
 6 October – John Bennett Tunbridge, police commissioner (born 1850)
 12 October – John Mackintosh Roberts, soldier, magistrate (born 1840)
 27 October – James Gardiner, politician (born 1861)
 18 November – Harold Williams, journalist, polyglot (born 1876)
 6 December – James Fulton, surveyor, civil engineer (born 1854)
 13 December – Richard Teece, actuary, cricket administrator (born 1847)
 27 December – Effie Richardson, landowner, litigant (born 1849)

See also
List of years in New Zealand
Timeline of New Zealand history
History of New Zealand
Military history of New Zealand
Timeline of the New Zealand environment
Timeline of New Zealand's links with Antarctica

References

External links

 
Years of the 20th century in New Zealand